Isaak Sigal (Russian: Исаак Яковлевич Сигал; Ukrainian: Ісаак Якович Сігал; born 31 March 1927, Vinnytsia, Ukraine) is a Ukrainian scientist in the field of fuel combustion and protection of the atmosphere from industrial pollution.

Professor Isaak Yakovlevitch Sigal holds a position of chief of department of the Gas Institute of NASU (National Academy of Science of Ukraine).

In 1960s — 1970s, for the first time in the USSR, Isaak Sigal conducted a research of nitrogen oxides formation in a plume, developed scientific foundation for nitrogen oxide formation within burning processes, founded a new trend and school of thought studying the conditions of formation and methods of fuel combustion in the power plant boilers as well as industrial and heating boilers with lowered nitrogen oxide formation; also methods of thermal treatment for atmospheric industrial gas emissions.

He is well known by a broad circle of experts for his monograph “Air Protection During Fuel Combustion”, and its second edition (combined print run of the two editions — 12 thousand copies) and pioneering articles on nitrogen oxide formation in the following magazines: Heat Power Engineering, Industrial Energy Engineering, Power Plant Engineering, Gas Industry (Moscow), Echo Tech and Energy Conservation (Kyiv), and others.

Developed by Sigal and his students, the methods and lowered nitrogen oxide formation burners have been implemented on over 100 power plant boilers and 900 high-capacity water-heating and industrial boilers.

Specialized gas boilers TVG (now KVG) and other ones, with the productive capacity of 4...10 MW, developed under his supervision, deliver heat to residential quarters with the population of 9 million people.

In the recent years, a set of operations has been put in place to modernize the water-heating boilers of TPPs with the capacity of 58...210 MW, to research and implement biogas combustion processes in industrial boilers.

18 master's dissertations have been prepared and defended under his supervision. Sigal has authored over 290 published works including 14 monographs, over 60 inventor's certificates and patents (patents of: Ukraine, Russia, Germany, USA, Canada, Italy, Egypt, etc.).

Sigal is a member of the state prize committee department of Ukraine, member of the academic council for conferring of the Doctor of Engineering degree; editorial board member of three scientific and technical magazines. He has been awarded a lot of medals including Man and Biosphere 1975-1985 UNESCO medal, USSR Inventor medal, two gold and silver medals of the Exhibition of Economic Achievements of the USSR, two appreciation tokens from the Kyiv Municipal Administration.

Biography 

Isaac Yakovlevich Sigal was born in 1927 in the city of Vinnytsia. His father, Yakov Sigal, was an electric engineer. His mother, Gusta Shternberg, was a teacher. He graduated from Kyiv Polytechnic Institute in 1948 majoring in combustion equipment engineering. Since 1949 he worked at the Gas Institute under NASU, becoming a head of a department in 1961. He defended his master's dissertation in 1958, doctoral in 1971; in 1980 he became a full professor. In 1998, Isaak Sigal was granted the honorary title of Honored Scientist and Engineer of Ukraine.

Family 

He married Ella Zacharovna Tovbina. In 1955, their son Alexander was born.

Implemented Inventions 

1950—1960 — methods of transferring heating boilers and furnaces to gas. Straight-slot bottom burners were utilized on 3000 steam and water-heating boilers, methods of transferring the furnaces to gas were utilized on 500000 furnaces.

1960—1965 — special gas water-heating boilers TVG (and their modification, KVG) with the productive rate of 4..10 MW. 8500 boilers in operation: heat supply for Ukrainian cities, Moscow region, the Volga region, Siberia, the Baltic states.

1965—1980 — methods of  thermal cleaning of gaseous emission in boiler combustors, implemented at 20 plants.

1966—1990 — the mechanism and methods of lowering nitrogen oxidation in boilers. Staged combustion burners as well as other developments were implemented on the boilers at major power plants and boiler stations of the cities of Kyiv, Moscow, Lviv, Kazan, Surgut, Vilnius, Riga, Sofia, etc. (with the total of over 1000 boilers).

1991—2007 — methods of modernization of potent water-heating boilers, (Darnitsa TPP, «Zhitomirtempokommunenergo»).

2000—2007 — processes and burner devices for biogas combustion in steam boilers (Bortnicheskie sewage treatment plants, city of Kyiv; alcohol plants, city of Electrogorsk (Russia), Luzhany (Ukraine).

Major Monographs

Edited by Isaak Sigal

Awards 
 Ukrainian State Science and Engineering Award (2012)
 Order of Merit Third Class (2009)
 Honored Scientist and Engineer of Ukraine (1998)

References

External links
  Interministerial Commission on Climate Change
 Biomass For Energy Conference
 Biography
 
 

Scientists from Kyiv
1927 births
Living people
Laureates of the State Prize of Ukraine in Science and Technology